Anthony Kerr is a British jazz vibraphone player, who has performed and recorded internationally with Georgie Fame, Charlie Watts, BBC Big Band, Robbie Williams, Joe Lovano, Jacqui Dankworth, and Courtney Pine. His compositions have been broadcast on BBC Radio.

He teaches vibraphone and jazz improvisation at the Royal College of Music in London and produces and records music from his home studio in Hertfordshire.

Biography

He was born in Belfast, Northern Ireland on 16 October 1965. From 1981 till 1984 he received his education at the Belfast School of Music. After graduation he moved to New York to study vibes and marimba with David Friedman and Kenny Werner. In 1987 he won a scholarship to the New School of Jazz and Contemporary Music. He worked as a percussionist with the RTE Symphony Orchestra. And for some time he was employed with UK's National Theater.

Later he worked as a jazz musician with such artist as John Taylor, Louis Stewart, Peter King, Norma Winstone, Mike Westbrook, a bandleader, which he travelled around Europe with.
He worked with such musicians as Charlie Watts and Georgie Fame, simultaneously leading his own group and conducting jazz workshops in Belfast. He also toured with Irish Youth Jazz Orchestra.

He also worked with BBC Big Band and collaborated with Ian Shaw and a saxophonist Dale Barlow.

He leads his own quartet and the Mallet Band, with Justin Woodward, Stewe Brown and Geoff Gascoyne.

Kerr was voted best instrumentalist in the 1994 British Jazz Awards, and Young Jazz Musician of the Year in 1995.  He also won nominations in the ‘Rising Star’ category in 1995, 1996 and 1998.

His first album "First Cry" was made in collaboration with singer / lyricist Jacqui Dankworth. His second album, "Now Hear This" which was recorded live at Ronnie Scott’s Club, was released in 1997.

Albums
First Cry, with Jacqui Dankworth 
Now Hear This (1997)
Resonator, with Kathryn Williams (2016)

References

External links

Living people
1965 births
British jazz vibraphonists
Academics of the Royal Academy of Music
BBC Big Band members